Glaphyria potentalis is a moth in the family Crambidae. It is found in Panama and Costa Rica.

References

Moths described in 1914
Glaphyriini